Carl Hansen may refer to:

Carl William Hansen (1872–1936), Danish author
Carl Hansen (footballer) (1898–1978), Danish footballer
Carl Hansen Ostenfeld (1873–1931), Danish systematic botanist
Carl Manicus-Hansen (1877–1960), Danish gymnast
Carl Hansen (American football) (born 1976), American football player
Carl Hansen (Wisconsin politician) (1866–1918), American politician
Carl Hansen (wrestler) (1887–1953), Danish wrestler
Carl G. O. Hansen (1871–1960), Norwegian-American journalist, musician and author
Carl W. Hansen, Danish association football referee

See also
Karl Hansen (disambiguation)
Carl Frølich Hanssen (1883–1960), Norwegian military officer and sports executive